Sampo Ranta (born 31 May 2000) is a Finnish professional ice hockey forward currently playing with the Colorado Eagles in the American Hockey League (AHL) as a prospect to the Colorado Avalanche of the National Hockey League (NHL). He played college ice hockey at Minnesota.

Playing career

Collegiate
Ranta began his collegiate career for the Minnesota Golden Gophers during the 2018–19 season. During his junior year in the 2020–21 season, Ranta recorded 19 goals and 12 assists in 31 games for the Gophers. Following an outstanding season, he was named to the All-Big Ten First Team and named an AHCA First Team All-American. He finished his career at Minnesota with 37 goals and 30 assists in 102 games.

Professional
On 3 April 2021, Ranta signed a three-year, entry-level contract with the Colorado Avalanche. He made his professional debut for the Colorado Eagles on 10 April 2021. He recorded his first professional goal in his second game on 14 April 2021. He recorded four goals and three assists in 14 AHL games. He was called up by the Avalanche during the 2021 Stanley Cup playoffs. He made his NHL debut during Game 1 of Colorado's second-round series against the Vegas Golden Knights.

International play

Ranta represented Finland at the 2018 IIHF World U18 Championships where he recorded one goal and one assist in seven games and won a gold medal. He represented Finland at the 2020 World Junior Ice Hockey Championships.

Career statistics

Regular season and playoffs

International

Awards and honors

References

External links
 

2000 births
Living people
Colorado Avalanche draft picks
Colorado Avalanche players
Colorado Eagles players
Finnish ice hockey left wingers
Minnesota Golden Gophers men's ice hockey players
People from Naantali
Sioux City Musketeers players
AHCA Division I men's ice hockey All-Americans
Sportspeople from Southwest Finland